Albert "Ab" Willem Tresling (9 May 1909 in The Hague – 29 October 1980 in Breda) was a Dutch field hockey player who competed in the 1928 Summer Olympics.

He was a member of the Dutch field hockey team, which won the silver medal. He played all four matches as back and scored one goal.

External links
 
profile

1909 births
1980 deaths
Dutch male field hockey players
Olympic field hockey players of the Netherlands
Field hockey players at the 1928 Summer Olympics
Olympic silver medalists for the Netherlands
Field hockey players from The Hague
Olympic medalists in field hockey
Medalists at the 1928 Summer Olympics